Grace Taylor may refer to:
Grace Dyer Taylor (1859–1867)
Grace Oladunni Taylor (born 1937), biochemist
Grace Taylor (poet) (born c. 1984), New Zealand poet
Grace Taylor (gymnast) (born 1988), American gymnast